The University of the Philippines (UP) is a state university system in the Philippines. It is the country's national university, as mandated by Republic Act No. 9500 (UP Charter of 2008), giving it institutional autonomy.

Originally founded by the American colonial government on June 18, 1908, it was established through the ratification of Act No. 1870 of the 1st Philippine Legislature to serve as an "advanced instruction in literature, philosophy, the sciences and arts, and to give professional and technical training" to eligible students regardless of  "age, sex, nationality, religious belief and political affiliation."

The University of the Philippines system has 8 constituent universities (CUs): UP Diliman, which serves as the system's flagship university, UP Los Baños, UP Manila, UP Visayas, UP Open University, UP Mindanao, UP Baguio, and UP Cebu which are scattered across 17 campuses.

Widely regarded and often cited as the Philippines' top university system, its alumni include a Nobel Peace Prize laureate, 7 of 17 Philippine presidents, 14 of 26 chief justices, 36 of 42 national scientists, and 40 of 57 national artists, the most of any university. UP's alumni also include more senators as well as members of the Philippine House of Representatives than any other university. Among its alumni are also 15,000 doctors, 15,000 engineers, 8,000 lawyers, 23,000 teachers, and thousands of graduates in other academic fields, which comprise some of its approximate 260,000 living alumni worldwide. UP has the most National Centers of Excellence and Development among higher education institutions in the country, and is one of the only three schools in Asia that have received institutional recognition in the Ramon Magsaysay Awards. Senate Resolution No. 276 of the Senate of the Philippines recognizes the institution as "the nation's premier university"; UP ranks as the country's No. 1 university, among the top 100 Asian universities, and among the top 400 universities worldwide in annual university rankings by Books Center.

History

1900s - 1940s 
On June 18, 1908, the University of the Philippines was established through an act of the First Philippine Legislature. Act No. 1870, otherwise known as the "University Act", specified the function of the university, which is to provide advanced instruction in literature, philosophy, the sciences and arts, and to administer professional and technical training.

The university began with the establishment of the Philippine Medical School (later incorporated into the university as the College of Medicine and Surgery) in 1905, which started operating in 1907, a year ahead of the rest of the U.P. System. Together with the College of Fine Arts and the College of Liberal Arts, the College of Medicine occupied buildings distributed along Padre Faura Street (Ermita district) and R. Hidalgo Street (Quiapo district) in Manila, while the School of Agriculture was in Los Baños, Laguna. A few years later, the university opened the College of Law and the College of Engineering in Manila, as well as academic units under the College of Agriculture and Forestry in Los Baños, Laguna. The Board of Regents approved the decision to look for a larger site, and a 493-hectare lot was acquired by the university in Diliman, Quezon City, then a town in the province of Rizal. Construction of the Quezon City campus began in 1939.

During World War II, most of its colleges had to be closed except the Colleges of Medicine, Pharmacy, and Engineering. Meanwhile, the Japanese Imperial Army occupied three Diliman campus buildings: the College of Liberal Arts Building (now Benitez Hall) and the Colleges of Law (now Malcolm Hall) and Business Administration Building. The Japanese also occupied the campus of the College of Agriculture in Los Baños. U.P. President Bienvenido Ma. Gonzalez sought a grant of ₱ 13 million from the US-Philippines War Damage Commission. A massive rehabilitation and construction effort was executed during the post-war years. For the first time, an extensive Diliman campus master plan and map were created in 1949. More buildings were built across the Diliman campus landscape: the University Library (Gonzalez Hall), the College of Engineering (Melchor Hall), the Women's Residence Hall (now Kamia Residence Hall), the Conservatory of Music (Abelardo Hall and now the College of Music), the Administration Building (Quezon Hall), and the U.P. President's Residence. Most colleges and administration offices were temporarily housed in huts and shelters made of sawali and galvanized iron.

During U.P.'s 40th anniversary in February 1949, central administrative offices of U.P. were moved from Manila to Diliman together with the transfer of the U.P. Oblation. Administrative offices and its regional units in Manila, Los Baños, Baguio, and Cebu were all housed in the Diliman campus. General commencement exercises were also held in Diliman for the first time in 1949.

1950s - 1960s 
In the 1950s, new academic units and degree programs were established. Another major reform, the General Education (G.E.) Program, was introduced in 1959. The G.E. Program became a series of core courses prescribed for all students at the undergraduate level. Most of these courses were being taught at the then College of Liberal Arts. As a result, U.P. President Vicente Sinco saw fit to reorganize the college into a University College, which would offer the core subjects to be taken during the first two years of the undergraduate program. Meanwhile, the College of Arts and Sciences and Graduate School of Arts and Sciences, offered major courses in the humanities, natural sciences, and social sciences. During President Sinco's term, more institutes and colleges were established. These institutes and colleges include the Institute of Public Administration (1952), the Statistical Center (1953), the Labor Education Center (now the School of Labor and Industrial Relations, established in 1954), the Asian Studies Institute (now the Asian Center, established in 1955), the Institute of Library Science (now the School of Library and Information Studies, established in 1961), and the College of Home Economics (1961).

The administration of U.P. President Carlos P. Romulo was marked by the founding of the Population Institute, the Law Center and the Applied Geodesy and Photogrammetry Training Center in 1964; the Institute of Mass Communication, the College of Business Administration, and the Institute of Planning in 1965; the Computer Center, the Institute for Small-Scale Industries in 1966, the Institute of Social Work and Community Development in 1967, and the Asian Center in 1968.

Marcos era period 
During the Martial Law period, U.P.'s administrators tried to sustain the university's educational priorities and institutional autonomy. At the height of activism in the university, U.P. President Salvador P. Lopez established a system of democratic consultation in which decisions such as promotions and appointments were made through greater participation by the faculty and administrative personnel. Lopez also reorganized U.P. into the U.P. System. During that period of activism, U.P. Diliman was called the Diliman Republic and elements of the police and the Metrocom stormed the campus during Martial Law. In November 1972, the Los Baños campus was the first to be declared an autonomous unit under a chancellor. A ₱ 150 million grant from the national budget boosted U.P.'s Infrastructure Development Program. In Diliman, it funded the construction of buildings for the Colleges of Business Administration and Zoology, the Institute of Small-Scale Industries, the Transport Training Center, and the Coral Laboratory of the Marine Sciences Institute. Kalayaan Residence Hall and housing for low-income employees were also built around this time.

U.P. President Onofre D. Corpuz declared U.P. Manila, then known as the Health Sciences Center, and U.P. Visayas as autonomous units. At the same time, the Asian Institute of Tourism (AIT) was established in light of the prioritization of tourism as a national industry. New centers for research and degree-granting units such as the Third World Studies Center (1977), Creative Writing Center, National Engineering Center (1978), U.P. Extension Program in San Fernando, Pampanga (1979), which is now in Clark Freeport Zone, Pampanga, Institute of Islamic Studies (1973), U.P. Film Center, National Center for Transportation Studies (1976) were also established. U.P. celebrated its 75th year in 1983. In the same spirit, a U.P. Extension Program in Olongapo was also established in 1984.

Edgardo Angara's Diamond Jubilee project raised ₱ 80 million which was earmarked for the creation of new professorial chairs and faculty grants. Angara also organized the Management Review Committee (MRC) and the committee to Review Academic Programs (CRAP) to evaluate and recommend measures for improving university operations. The MRC report led to a wide-ranging reorganization of the U.P. System, the further decentralization of U.P. administration, and the declaration of U.P. Diliman as an autonomous unit on March 23, 1983. U.P. Baguio was then placed under the supervision of U.P. Diliman. Meanwhile, the College of Arts and Sciences also underwent a reorganization to become three separate colleges: the College of Science (CS), the College of Arts and Letters (CAL), and the College of Social Sciences and Philosophy (CSSP). There has been problems regarding this ever since the three colleges separated.

As the flagship campus, U.P. Diliman led the rest of the units. On April 26, 1982, it was formally designated as a constituent university, almost a decade after the reorganization. Although Diliman was the seat of the U.P. Administration, the campus was not immediately constituted after 1972. It was administered, along with the Manila unit, prior to the organization of the Health Sciences Center, as a de facto university.

1980s to 1990s 
U.P. President José Abueva introduced the Socialized Tuition Fee Assistance Program (STFAP) in 1987. Abueva also institutionalized a Filipino language policy within the university. U.P. President Emil Javier established the creation of U.P. Mindanao at Davao City, Southern Mindanao, and the U.P. Open University in 1995. U.P. President Francisco Nemenzo's legacy includes the Revitalized General Education Program (RGEP) and the institutionalization of more incentives for research and creative achievements by U.P. faculty members.

U.P. President Emerlinda Roman, from the College of Business Administration (CBA), has led a Centennial Campaign Fund to upgrade the university's services and facilities. Her term of office has been noted for the ascension of several key professors from the CBA to positions of power within the university. Notable among them is U.P. Diliman Chancellor Sergio S. Cao, Assistant Vice President for Planning and Development, Prof. Arthur S. Cayanan, Director of the U.P. System Budget Office, Prof. Joselito G. Florendo, Dr. Lina J. Valcarcel Executive Director, U.P. Provident Fund, Inc. and U.P. Foundation, Inc. Executive Director Gerardo B. Agulto.

Centennial celebration

On January 8, 2008, the University of the Philippines began its centennial celebration. The opening ceremony featured a 100-torch relay to light the eternal flame on the Centennial Cauldron at Quezon Hall. Torches were carried by, among others, Fernando Javier, 100, of Baguio, the oldest U.P. alumnus (Civil Engineering from University of the Philippines Manila, 1933), Michael Dumlao, a 6th-grader from the University of the Philippines Integrated School in U.P. Diliman and U.P. President Emerlinda Roman, the first woman president of the university. The Centennial Cauldron features three pillars to represent the three core values, and seven flowers representing the seven constituent universities, i.e. U.P. Manila, U.P. Diliman (together with U.P. Pampanga, its extension campus), U.P. Los Baños, U.P. Baguio, U.P. Visayas, U.P. Mindanao, and U.P. Open University.

The Bangko Sentral ng Pilipinas (BSP) and U.P. issued commemorative ₱ 100 U.P. Centennial notes at the BSP Security Plant Complex in Quezon City. The notes appear as four-outs (four uncut pieces) in a folder featuring the signatures of all U.P. presidents including Roman.

Inspired by the U.P. Oblation, the University of the Philippines Alumni Association (UPAA) launched an art exhibit, "100 Nudes/100 Years" featuring the works of nine U.P. alumni national artists.

U.P.A.A. 2008 centennial yearbook
The University of the Philippines Alumni Association announced its launching of a three-volume U.P.A.A. 2008 Centennial Yearbook on June 21, 2008, at the U.P.A.A. Grand Alumni-Faculty Homecoming and Reunion at the Araneta Coliseum, Cubao, Quezon City. The theme is “U.P. Alumni: Excellence, Leadership and Service in the Next 100 Years," with the three cover designs showing the works of National Artists Napoleon Abueva, Abdulmari Asia Imao, and Benedicto Cabrera, respectively. Chief Justice Reynato Puno is the Yearbook's most distinguished alumnus awardee (among 46 other awardees).

U.P. Charter of 2008
The U.P. Charter of 2008, Republic Act No. 9500, was signed by President Gloria Macapagal Arroyo into law on April 29, 2008, at the U.P. Library Conference Hall in Lahug, Cebu. It aims "to provide both institutional and fiscal autonomy to U.P., specifically, to protect student's democratic access and strengthen administration through the recognition of U.P. System's Board of Regents and U.P. Council." The new charter declared U.P. as the Philippines' national university, giving it "the enhanced capability to fulfill its mission and spread the benefits of knowledge." The new charter will help improve its competitiveness. The newly designated “national university" however, needs ₱ 3.6 billion to be on a par with other universities in the region.

UP-Ayala Land TechnoHub

It was developed by the Ayala Land Property company into an information technology and IT-enabled services community to host business process outsourcing (BPO) and technology firms.

Autonomous units
At present, the University of the Philippines is composed of eight constituent universities (CU) located in 15 campuses around the country.

U.P. Diliman is the flagship campus of the university and offers the most courses. On July 19, 2011, the Bases Conversion and Development Authority donated to U.P. a 4,300-square meter (1 acre) lot at the Bonifacio Global City (BGC) in Taguig for the U.P. Professional Schools, which will initially include extension classes for UP Diliman's College of Law, College of Business Administration, College of Engineering, School of Statistics, as well as the UP Open University.

Each constituent university of U.P. is headed by a chancellor, who is elected on a three-year term by the Board of Regents. Unlike the president, who is elected on a single six-year term without re-election, the chancellor maybe re-elected for another three-year term but it is upon the discretion of the members of the Board of Regents.

Satellite campuses
The satellite campuses do not have autonomous status. They are considered extension colleges of their parent unit. Some campuses host different programs of various colleges within the parent unit.

UP Diliman
UPD Bonifacio Global City Professional Schools (Taguig City, Metro Manila)
UPD Extension Program in Olongapo (Olongapo City, Zambales)
UPD Extension Program in Pampanga (Clark Freeport Zone, Mabalacat, Pampanga)

UP Los Baños
UPLB Professional School for Agriculture and the Environment (Panabo City, Davao del Norte)

UP Manila
UPM School of Health Sciences in Baler (Baler, Aurora)
UPM School of Health Sciences in Koronadal (Koronadal City, South Cotabato)
UPM School of Health Sciences in Palo (Palo, Leyte)
UPM School of Health Sciences in Tarlac (Tarlac City, Tarlac)

UP Visayas
UPV Iloilo City Campus (Iloilo City)
UPV Tacloban College (Tacloban City, Leyte)

UP Open University
Seven (7) learning centers across the country

Basic education
University of the Philippines High School Cebu in UP Cebu
 University of the Philippines High School Iloilo in UP Visayas
University of the Philippines Integrated School in UP Diliman
University of the Philippines Rural High School in UP Los Baños

Organization

Presidents of the University of the Philippines

The President of the University of the Philippines is elected for a single six-year term by the university's eleven-member Board of Regents. As of 2023, two Americans and 20 Filipinos served as President of the University of the Philippines.

The current president of U.P. is lawyer and former regent Angelo Jimenez. He assumed office on February 10, 2023.

Board of Regents
The governance of the university is vested in the Board of Regents of the University of the Philippines System (or Lupon ng mga Rehente in Filipino) and commonly abbreviated as BOR. The board, with its 11 members, is the highest decision-making body of the U.P. system.

The Chairperson of the Commission on Higher Education (CHED) serves as the Board's Chairperson while the President of the University of the Philippines is the co-chairperson. The Chairpersons of the Committee on Higher, Technical and Vocational Education of the Senate and the Committee on Higher and Technical Education House of Representatives are members of the Board of Regents which are concurrent with their functions as committee chairpersons.

U.P. students, represented by the General Assembly of Student Councils, nominate a Student Regent. While the Faculty Regent is likewise nominated by the faculty members of the whole University. Alumni are represented by the President of the U.P. Alumni Association. A Staff Regent, representing professional and administrative personnel, was included with the passage of the new U.P. Charter in 2008. The remaining members of the Board of Regents are nominated into the position by the President of the Philippines.

As of 2023, the members of the Board of Regents of the University of the Philippines System are:

The Secretary of the university and the Board of Regents is Atty. Roberto M.J. Lara.

Academics

The University of the Philippines System offers 246 undergraduate degree programs and 362 graduate degree programs, more than any other university in the country.
The flagship campus in Diliman offers the largest number of degree programs, and other campuses are known to lead and specialize in specific programs. The university has 57 degree-granting units throughout the system, which may be a college, School or Institute that offers an undergraduate or a graduate program. In the Los Baños campus, a separate Graduate School administers the graduate programs in agriculture, forestry, the basic sciences, mathematics and statistics, development economics and management, agrarian studies and human ecology. The College of Public Health at the Manila campus has a collaboration with Boston University School of Public Health. This program allows students from Boston University to do a semester of coursework at U.P. Manila as well as an international field practicum in the Philippines. The university has 4,571 faculty, trained locally and abroad with 36% having graduate degrees. The university is one of the three universities in the Philippines affiliated with the ASEAN University Network, and the only Philippine university to be affiliated with the ASEAN-European University Network and the Association of Pacific Rim Universities.

Budget
The university has the highest financial endowment of all educational institutions in the Philippines. In 2008, the entire U.P. System received a financial subsidy from the national government of ₱ 5.7 billion. The total expenditure for the same year, however, is ₱ 7.2 billion, or approximately ₱ 135,000 per student. State universities and colleges have continually experienced budget cuts over the years. In 2019, the university requested ₱44.9 billion budget but only received ₱15.5 billion for its budget, with additional ₱1.5 billion for operational and equipment expenses. The Philippine General Hospital, the most affected unit of the UP System, received an insufficient budget of P2.92 billion, with only P155 million out of the requested P1.6 billion allocated for infrastructure and capital outlays.

Rankings and reputation

The UP, as a university system, has been consistently ranked the top university in the Philippines since its inclusion in several university rankings. In 2020, UP was ranked 65th in the Times Higher Education (THE) Asia University Rankings and 69th in the QS Asia University Rankings for 2021, the highest ranked Philippine university. In the THE rankings, UP is the fifth best university in Southeast Asia, after National University of Singapore (3rd), Nanyang Technological University (6th), University of Malaya (43rd) and Universiti Brunei Darussalam (60th). On the other hand, the QS rankings put it as the 13th best university in Southeast Asia after two Singapore, five Malaysian, three Indonesian, and two Thai universities.

Moreover, UP ranks in numerous world subject rankings, most notably 51-100th place in Development Studies, 101-150th place in English Language and Literature, Geography, and Politics and International Studies, 151-200th place in Archaeology, Agriculture and Forestry, and Sociology in the QS World University Rankings by Subject Area. UP programs also place in Times Higher Education World University Rankings: 126-150th in Clinical, Pre-Clinical and Health subjects; 501-600 bracket for both Life Sciences and Social Sciences; in the 601+ bracket for Engineering and Technology, and Computer Science; and in the 801+ bracket in Physical Sciences.

Earlier, in the Asiaweek's Best Universities in Asia last published in 2000, UP ranked 48th. In 2006 the university, through President Emerlinda R. Roman, has expressed that it does not want to participate in the THES Ranking, but was included in 2007, 2008, and 2009 with an incomplete academic profile.

In the national rankings based on cumulative data from 1991 to 2001 of average passing rates in all courses of all Philippine colleges and universities in the licensure examinations, U.P. Diliman, U.P. Los Baños and U.P. Manila emerged as numbers one, two and three respectively. The study was done by the Professional Regulation Commission and the Commission on Higher Education.

General education program
The General Education Program was introduced in 1959 and formed core courses prescribed for all students at the undergraduate level. The General Education Program is the Revitalized General Education Program (abbreviated as RGEP), which was approved by the Board of Regents in 2001. The RGEP offers courses in three domains (Arts and Humanities; Mathematics, Science, and Technology; and Social Sciences and Philosophy) and gives students the freedom to choose the general education subjects in these domains that they would like to take. It has led to the development of courses unique to the campuses. Examples of these courses include NASC 10 (Forests as Source of Life) in Los Baños, Geography 1 (Places and Landscapes in a Changing World) in Diliman, and History 3 (History of Philippine Ethnic Minorities) in Baguio.

Library system
The university library system contains the largest collections of agricultural, medical, veterinary and animal science materials in the Philippines. The library system has a collection of Filipiniana material, serials and journals in both electronic and physical forms and UPIANA materials in its archives. It also has a collection of documents of student, political, and religious organizations advocating political, economic, and social changes during the Marcos administration in the Diliman library.

The university is one of the five governmental agencies involved with the Philippine eLib, a nationwide information resource-sharing consortium, to which it provides access to 758,649 of its bibliographic records.

The library was established in 1922 in the Manila campus and was considered one of the best in Asia prior to the Second World War. The collection, containing almost 150,000 volumes, was destroyed when Japanese troops stormed the library during the war, leaving only a handful of books intact. Gabriel Bernardo, the Librarian of the university who built the collection, described the loss as "intellectual famine." Bernardo would later rebuild the library in the Diliman campus. The university has likewise been one of the pioneers in library science education in the country. Library courses were first offered under the College of Liberal Arts under James Alexander Robertson in 1914. In 1961, the Institute of Library Science was established in Diliman and a year later, the institute established the country's first graduate program in Library Science.

Admissions and financial aid

Undergraduate admissions
As a public state university, "selection is based on intellectual and personal preparedness of the applicant irrespective of sex, religious belief and political affiliation." Admission into the university's undergraduate programs is very competitive, with over 70,000 students taking the exam every year, with about 11,000 being accepted, an admission rate of about 18%. Admission to a program is usually based on the result of the UPCAT, University Predicted Grade (UPG), which is an average of grades obtained during high school and sometimes, a quota set by the unit offering the program. The university also maintains a Policy of Democratization which aims to "make the U.P. studentry more representative of the nation's population." The UPCAT also allows students to enter Intarmed, the university's accelerated 7-year medicine curriculum, one of the two entry points into the program. Transferring to the university from other constituent units or schools outside the system are determined by the degree-granting unit that offers the program or the course, not by the university's Office of Admissions.

Socialized Tuition System
The Socialized Tuition System (also referred to as the “Iskolar ng Bayan" Program) (STS) was implemented in response to the increase in tuition in 2014. The program, proposed in 1988 by U.P. President Jose Abueva and mandated by the President and Congress of the Philippines, called for a radical departure from the old fee and scholarship structure of UP, resulting in tremendous benefits for low-income and disadvantaged Filipino students. The Socialized Tuition and Financial Assistance Program (STFAP) is divided into four basic components: Subsidized Education, Socialized Tuition, Scholarships, and Student Assistantships. In the 1989 STFAP, income groups are divided into nine brackets, with one having the full benefits. In December 2006, the Board of Regents approved a restructured STFAP, along with the increase in tuition and other fees that will apply for incoming freshmen.

The Revised STFAP reduces the brackets from nine to five, and will supposedly increase the number of students receiving tuition subsidy and increase stipend rates and coverage. However, critics of the restructured STFAP argue that the data used in the formulation of the revised program is not an acceptable prediction of a student's family income, that some of the bracket assignments are flawed and that the program fails to address or revise student assistantship programs.

Culture, sports and traditions

University symbols

The university's colors are maroon and forest green. Maroon was chosen to represent the fight for freedom, as Maroon is also a name of a Jamaican tribe who were successful in defending their freedom from slavery and their independence from English conquerors for more than 100 years. The colors are also immortalized in the University's hymn;

In 2004, the university's seal and the Oblation were registered in the Philippine Intellectual Property Office to prevent unauthorized use and multiplication of the symbols for the centennial of the university in 2008. The centennial logo was used in visual materials and presentations of the centennial activities and events of the university. The logo, which was designed by Ringer Manalang, is composed of the Oblation, the sablay and a highlighted Philippine map.

Official seal

The Seal of the University of the Philippines is the official device used by the university as its official symbol and mark for its legal and public documents and publications. The current seal in use was approved by the Board of Regents on February 25, 1913, during its 77th Meeting. It has two versions: a one-color and a full-color version, using the prescribed tones of Maroon and Forest Green, the official colors of the university as set by the University Brand Book released in 2007. The seal was registered in the Philippine Intellectual Property Office and was approved in the year 2006 to prevent unauthorized use in time for U.P.'s Centennial Celebration in 2008.

The bald eagle  in the official seal holds a shield that carries a lamp, a cogwheel and; a volcano and tree (sometimes rendered erroneously as a star and the planet Saturn). These symbols represent science and medicine, engineering, and agriculture respectively. Until today, the university takes pride in these three areas of knowledge as these degree programs in U.P. are acknowledged as Centers of Excellence in the Philippines by the Commission on Higher Education. A myth persists that the bird in the seal is in fact, a parrot, as stated in some Freshmen orientation materials. The university's varsity team was also once called the Parrots, adding to the confusion about the species of the bird in question. An explanation for the use of the eagle in the seal is that it was derived from the coat of arms of the City of Manila and the Great Seal of the United States of America.

Starting with the reorganization of the U.P. System in 1972, in order to signify their newly gained autonomy and specialization, most constituent universities of the System have adopted their own seals. These logos are either variations of the official seal, by changing the colors and adding elements, or are entirely new designs. These are sometimes used in place of the official University seal in official documents, such as transcripts and markers. Distinct seals or logos are sometimes produced, such as those for the U.P. System and UPLB Centennial Celebrations. A notable use of the System seal can be seen in the official seal of the U.P. Alumni Association, which features the Oblation, the Diliman Carillon, the Bahay ng Alumni facade and the university seal in its entirety.

U.P. Naming Mahal
U.P. Naming Mahal, or U.P. Our Beloved, is the university's hymn. The melody for the song was written by Nicanor Abelardo, an alumnus and former faculty member of the U.P. College of Music. Abelardo is considered to be one of the Philippines' greatest musicians. Because of the original scale of the hymn in B flat major, which is too high for the usual voice, U.P. Conservatory of Music (now U.P. College of Music) professors Hilarion Rubio and Tomas Aguirre reset the music in G major. The choral version arranged by Nhick Pacis was performed by the UP Concert Chorus.

The English lyrics (entitled as "U.P. Beloved") was taken from a poem by Teogenes Velez, a Liberal Arts student. The translation to Filipino was a composite from seven entries in a contest held by the university. The judges did not find any of the seven translations as fully satisfactory.

Lyrics

Sablay

The university uses unique academic regalia, called the "Sablay," which is a sash patterned after the centuries-old sash academic regalia of Scandinavian universities.  The "Sablay" is a sash joined in front by an ornament and embroidered or printed with the university's initials in Baybayin script and running geometric motifs of indigenous Filipino ethnic groups. It is traditionally worn over a white or ecru dress for females or an ecru barong Tagalog and black pants for males, although there has been instances wherein the Sablay is worn over other indigenous clothing. Candidates for graduation wear the sablay at the right shoulder, and is then moved to the left shoulder after the President of the university confers their degree, similar to the moving of the tassel of the academic cap.

U.P. ROTC
The University of the Philippines ROTC Unit is the pioneer of the Reserve Officer Training Corps in the Philippines. With the activation of the U.P. ROTC Unit in 1912, several State and Private Universities-Colleges soon followed, activating ROTC units under the Army of the Philippine Commonwealth.

Although the Philippines had no significant military involvement during World War I, the conflagration made the Philippine Government realize the need for a good reserve force of able-bodied Filipinos trained in the art of war. With the formal organisation of the U.P. DMST on March 17, 1922, military drill was superseded by the term "military science and tactics."

Military training in the University of the Philippines started at the old Padre Faura Campus when it was made a required subject for all able-bodied male students in all colleges, institutes, and schools of the university. During the early years after its inception, military training in the university was mainly an infantry unit. After a few years, specialized units were established that made U.P. ROTC distinct for its military proficiency. U.P. produced precision FA Gunners through its Field Artillery Unit. Another distinguished U.P. ROTC Unit is the Rayadillo Honor Guard Battalion. It was created in 1963 by Carlos P. Romulo (U.P.ROTC/U.P. Vanguard Class 1918) during his term as U.P. President. The Rayadillo unit is famous for its patriotic Katipunero uniforms, silent drill exhibitions, arrival honors and formal military ceremonies rendered for visiting foreign heads of states and military officers.

UP Fighting Maroons

The UP Fighting Maroons is the name of the collegiate varsity teams of the University of the Philippines, primarily off Diliman, which play in the University Athletic Association of the Philippines (UAAP), the premiere sports league in the country. The collegiate women's varsity teams are also sometimes called the Lady Maroons. The University of the Philippines Integrated School is the affiliate juniors division high school. They play as the Junior Maroons, formerly the Preps.

Notable alumni
The University of the Philippines has numerous notable alumni and faculty. UP graduated many leading figures in the country. In the country's political history, UP has produced former Philippine presidents such as José P. Laurel; former senators Lorenzo Tañada, Jovito Salonga, and Ninoy Aquino; The 14th Vice President Leni Robredo; statesmen Arturo Tolentino, Gerardo Roxas, and Doy Laurel; prominent jurists such as former chief justices Hilario Davide, Maria Lourdes Sereno; incumbent Senators Francis Pangilinan and Richard J. Gordon; and incumbent Congressman Roman Romulo. In business, UP graduated billionaire and Araneta patriarch Jorge L. Araneta. Antonio Quirino, the founder of the first television station in the Philippines: Alto Broadcasting System (now part of ABS-CBN), is also a graduate, as is Marla Rausch, the founder and CEO of  Animation Vertigo, a motion-capture animation company. UP also produced the first Filipina Nobel Peace Prize laureate with Maria Ressa winning the award in 2021.

Student organizations 
The fraternities and sororities in UP are UP Delta Lambda Sigma Sorority, UP Portia Sorority (which produced UP Law dean Fides Cordero-Tan and Chief Justice Maria Lourdes Sereno, Alpha Phi Beta fraternity (which produced Chief Justice Reynato Puno), and Sigma Rho fraternity (which produced Justice Antonio Carpio and Senator Jovito R. Salonga), Alpha Sigma Fraternity (which produced UP Law dean and sitting Judge of the International Criminal Court Raul Pangalangan), Alpha Sigma Nu sorority, Alpha Phi Omega (which produced COMELEC Chair Haydee Yorac and Vice President Jejomar Binay), Pi Sigma Fraternity (which produced Bases Conversion and Development Authority CEO Arnel Casanova), UP Vanguard Fraternity (which produced Atty. Philip Sigfrid Fortun, the founding partner of the law firm Fortun, Narvasa and Salazar), Upsilon Sigma Phi (which produced President Ferdinand Marcos, President Jose P. Laurel, Vice President Doy Laurel, Vice President Arturo Tolentino, Senate President Gil Puyat, Senator Ninoy Aquino, Senator Richard Gordon, Senator Francis Pangilinan, Senator Joker Arroyo, Senator Gerardo Roxas, Senator Sotero Laurel, Senator Domocao Alonto, Senator Mamintal A.J. Tamano, Senator Estanislao Fernandez, Senator Juan Liwag, Chief Justice Querube Makalintal, Chief Justice Enrique Fernando, ten Associate Justices, ABS-CBN Vice President Jake Almeda Lopez, ABS founder (later part of a merger to form ABS-CBN) Antonio Quirino, and famous lawyer Estelito Mendoza), Pan Xenia Fraternity (which produced Manny Villar), Beta Sigma, Tau Alpha, Scintilla Juris, and Tau Gamma Phi. Each of these groups can boast of prominent alumni of the college as among its members. To gain membership, candidates must undergo initiation rites to determine a candidate's emotional stability, physical endurance, and mental capacity.

Security
The University of the Philippines system maintains its own independent campus police forces owing to the fact that the 1989 accord with the Department of National Defense (DND) which restricts the entry of the national government's police and the military in any of UP's campuses without prior notice.

The UP Diliman Police covers the Diliman campus while the University Police Force covers the Los Baños campus.

The accord was terminated by the DND in January 2021, but the termination is disputed by the UP system.

See also
DZUP 1602
Higher Education In The Philippines

References

CHED Scholarships

External links

 
 Act No. 1870  The act providing for the founding and organization of the University of the Philippines
University of the Philippines Charter of 2008 (PDF)  Republic Act No. 9500 declaring the University of the Philippines as the national university
  Apply for your SM Scholarship in the Philippines

 
1908 establishments in the Philippines
ASEAN University Network
Educational institutions established in 1908
English as a global language
Philippines
Research universities in the Philippines
Universities and colleges in the Philippines